Hymenocallis  (US) or  (UK) is a genus of American plants in the amaryllis family.

Hymenocallis contains more than 60 species of herbaceous bulbous perennials native to the southeastern United States, Mexico, Central America, the Caribbean, and northern South America. Some species are cultivated as ornamentals in warm nations around the globe, and a few have become naturalized in parts of Africa and on various tropical islands. Many of the species from the Caribbean and from the southeastern United States inhabit wet areas such as marshes, streambanks, and seashores. Some species even have floating seeds. Some of the Mexican species, in contrast, grow on grassy slopes in hills and mountains.

The flower stalks arise from basal rosettes of strap-shaped leaves. The terminal clusters of fragrant flowers are green, white or yellow, and can be large and spectacular. The genus name is derived from the Greek words ὑμήν (hymen), meaning "membrane", and καλός (kalos), meaning "beautiful".  It refers to the curious shape of the flowers, which consist of six narrow, curved petals attached to a shallow cup that is formed from the fused stamens. The effect is of a spidery daffodil or lily, thus explaining the common name "spider lily".

Taxonomy
The genus Hymenocallis was created by Richard Anthony Salisbury in 1812, when he separated out a number of species formerly placed in Pancratium, starting with Hymenocallis littoralis. The main reason for the separation was that the fruits have only two seeds in each locule. Salisbury explained the name as referring to the "beautiful membrane which connects the filaments."

Species

, the World Checklist of Selected Plant Families accepts 65 species:

 Hymenocallis acutifolia (Herb. ex Sims) Sweet - Mexico
 Hymenocallis araniflora T.M.Howard - Sinaloa, Nayarit
 Hymenocallis arenicola Northr. - Bahamas, Greater Antilles
 Hymenocallis astrostephana T.M.Howard - Guerrero
 Hymenocallis azteciana Traub - Jalisco, Nayarit, Zacatecas
 Hymenocallis baumlii Ravenna - Chiapas
 Hymenocallis bolivariana Traub - Monagas in Venezuela
 Hymenocallis caribaea (L.) Herb. – Caribbean spiderlily - West Indies
 Hymenocallis choctawensis Traub – Choctaw spiderlily - Louisiana to Florida Panhandle
 Hymenocallis choretis Hemsl. - southern Mexico
 Hymenocallis cleo Ravenna - Chiapas
 Hymenocallis clivorum Laferr. - Sonora
 Hymenocallis concinna Baker - Jalisco
 Hymenocallis cordifolia Micheli - Guerrero
 Hymenocallis coronaria (Leconte) Kunth – Cahaba lily - South Carolina, Georgia, Alabama
 Hymenocallis crassifolia Herb. - South Carolina, Georgia, North Carolina, Florida
 Hymenocallis durangoensis T.M.Howard - Durango
 Hymenocallis duvalensis Traub ex Laferr. – Dixie spiderlily - Georgia, Florida
 Hymenocallis eucharidifolia Baker - Guerrero, Oaxaca
 Hymenocallis fragrans (Salisb.) Salisb. - Jamaica
 Hymenocallis franklinensis Ger.L.Sm. – Franklin spiderlily - Florida Panhandle
 Hymenocallis gholsonii G.Lom.Sm. & Garland - Florida Panhandle
 Hymenocallis glauca (Zucc.) M.Roem. - central + southern Mexico
 Hymenocallis godfreyi G.L.Sm. & Darst – Godfrey's spiderlily - Florida Panhandle
 Hymenocallis graminifolia Greenm. - Morelos
 Hymenocallis guatemalensis Traub - Guatemala
 Hymenocallis guerreroensis T.M.Howard - Guerrero
 Hymenocallis harrisiana Herb. - central + southern Mexico
 Hymenocallis henryae Traub – Henry's spiderlily - Florida Panhandle
 Hymenocallis howardii Bauml - western Mexico
 Hymenocallis imperialis T.M.Howard - San Luis Potosí, Hidalgo
 Hymenocallis incaica Ravenna - Peru
 Hymenocallis jaliscensis M.E.Jones - Jalisco, Nayarit
 Hymenocallis latifolia (Mill.) M.Roem. – perfumed spiderlily - West Indies, Florida
 Hymenocallis leavenworthii (Standl. & Steyerm.) Bauml - Michoacán
 Hymenocallis lehmilleri T.M.Howard - Guerrero
 Hymenocallis limaensis Traub - Lima Province in Peru
 Hymenocallis liriosme (Raf.) Shinners – Texan spiderlily (yellow center) - south-central United States
 Hymenocallis littoralis (Jacq.) Salisb. - Mexico, Central America, northern South America
 Hymenocallis lobata Klotzsch - Venezuela
 Hymenocallis longibracteata Hochr. - Veracruz
 Hymenocallis maximilianii T.M.Howard - Guerrero
 Hymenocallis multiflora Vargas - Peru
 Hymenocallis occidentalis (Leconte) Kunth - southeastern + south-central United States
 Hymenocallis ornata (C.D.Bouché) M.Roem. - Guatemala
 Hymenocallis ovata (Mill.) M.Roem. - Cuba
 Hymenocallis palmeri S.Watson – alligator lily (yellow center) - Florida
 Hymenocallis partita Ravenna - Chiapas
 Hymenocallis phalangidis Bauml - Nayarit
 Hymenocallis pimana Laferr. - Chihuahua, Sonora
 Hymenocallis portamonetensis Ravenna - Chiapas
 Hymenocallis praticola Britton & P.Wilson - Cuba
 Hymenocallis proterantha Bauml - southern Mexico
 Hymenocallis pumila Bauml - Jalisco, Colima
 Hymenocallis puntagordensis Traub – Punta Gordo spiderlily - southern Florida
 Hymenocallis pygmaea Traub - North Carolina, South Carolina
 Hymenocallis rotata (Ker Gawl.) Herb. – streambank spiderlily - northern Florida
 †Hymenocallis schizostephana Worsley - Brazil but extinct
 Hymenocallis sonorensis Standl. - Sonora, Sinaloa, Nayarit
 Hymenocallis speciosa (L.f. ex Salisb.) Salisb. – green-tinge spiderlily - Windward Islands
 Hymenocallis tridentata Small - Florida
 Hymenocallis tubiflora Salisb. - Trinidad, Venezuela, Guianas, northwestern Brazil
 Hymenocallis vasconcelosii García-Mend. - Oaxaca, Puebla
 Hymenocallis venezuelensis Traub - Venezuela
 Hymenocallis woelfleana T.M.Howard - Durango, Sinaloa, Nayarit

Formerly included
Numerous names have been coined for species once considered members of Hymenocallis but now regarded as better suited to other genera. Most of the species are native to South America. Such genera include Clinanthus, Eucharis, Ismene, Leptochiton and Pancratium.  Below are some examples of these species:

Cultivation

Most Hymenocallis must be grown in a warm greenhouse or in a sheltered sunny spot where the ground does not freeze. The North American species H. occidentalis is found as far north as southwestern Indiana where winters can reach .  They like good drainage and grow well in a soil rich with organic matter. The following species and hybrids are found in cultivation:-

See also

 List of plants known as lily

References

 
Amaryllidaceae genera
Taxa named by Richard Anthony Salisbury